Škofi is a small settlement southeast of Gorjansko in the Municipality of Komen in the Littoral region of Slovenia close to the border with Italy.

References

External links
Škofi on Geopedia

Populated places in the Municipality of Komen